David Cameron (born 1966) is a former Prime Minister of the United Kingdom who served from 2010 to 2016.

David Cameron may also refer to:

Sports

Football
 David Cameron (Australian footballer) (born 1964), Australian rules footballer
 David Cameron (footballer, born 1895) (1895–1953), Scottish footballer
 David Cameron (footballer, born 1902), Scottish footballer
 David Cameron (footballer, born 1936) (1936–2006), Scottish footballer
 Dave Cameron (footballer) (born 1975), English football player and manager

Other sports
 Dave Cameron (ice hockey) (born 1958), Canadian ice hockey player
 David Cameron (darts player) (born 1969), Canadian darts player
 Dave Cameron (administrator) (born 1971), West Indies Cricket Board president, 2013–present
 David Cameron (rower) (born 1974), Australian rower
 Dave Cameron (baseball analyst) (born 1980), sports journalist

Other uses
 David Cameron (jurist) (1804–1872), first Chief Justice of the Crown Colony of Vancouver Island
 David Young Cameron (1865–1945), Scottish painter and etcher
 David Cameron, Australian actor in My First Wife
 David Cameron (Queer as Folk), a character on Queer as Folk

See also
 Premiership of David Cameron, his premiership